Ira Sullivan (May 1, 1931 – September 21, 2020) was an American jazz trumpeter, flugelhornist, flautist, saxophonist, and composer born in Washington, D.C., United States.  An active musician since the 1950s, he often worked with Red Rodney and Lin Halliday.

Biography
Sullivan was born on May 1, 1931, in Washington, D.C., United States. His father taught him to play the trumpet beginning at age 3, and his mother taught him saxophone. He played in 1950s Chicago, Illinois, with such musicians as Charlie Parker, Lester Young, Wardell Gray and Roy Eldridge, gaining a reputation as a fearsome bebop soloist. After playing briefly with Art Blakey in 1956, and mastering alto and baritone saxophone, Sullivan moved south to Florida and out of the spotlight in the early 1960s. His reluctance to travel limited his opportunities to play with musicians of the first rank, but Sullivan continued to play in the Miami area, often in schools and churches. Contact with local younger players, such as Jaco Pastorius and Pat Metheny led to teaching and to a broadening of his own musical roots to include the stylings of John Coltrane's jazz rock. With the addition of flute and soprano saxophone to his performing range, Sullivan moved to New York, and in 1980 formed a quintet with bop trumpeter Red Rodney. Sullivan and Rodney worked on new material and fostered young talent. Sullivan and his longtime friend and collaborator Stu Katz, jazz pianist and vibraphonist, co-led a multi-night performance with Katz at Joe Segal's The Jazz Showcase in Chicago.  A live recording of some of those performances, A Family Affair: Live At Joe Segal's Jazz Showcase, was released in 2011. Sullivan taught at the Young Musicians Camp each summer at the University of Miami.

Ira Sullivan died on September 21, 2020, of metastatic pancreatic cancer in his Miami home at age 89.

Ira Sullivan's musical signature was "Amazing Grace", the tune with which he closed every performance for decades. In the week following Sullivan's death, the jazz community produced a Love Letter to Ira Sullivan, a compilation of more than forty performances of "Amazing Grace".

Discography

As leader/co-leader
1958: Nicky's Tune (Delmark, issued 1970)
1959: Blue Stroll (Delmark)
1962: Bird Lives! (Vee-Jay)
1967: Horizons (Atlantic)
1976: Ira Sullivan (Horizon)
1977: Ira Sullivan (Flying Fish)
1978: Peace (Galaxy) - released 1979
1978: Multimedia (Galaxy) - released 1982
1980: The Incredible Ira Sullivan (Stash)
1981: Ira Sullivan Does It All (Muse)
1981: Spirit Within (Elektra/Musician) with Red Rodney
1982: Sprint (Elektra/Musician) with Red Rodney
1983: Strings Attached (Pausa)
1986: Gulfstream (Pausa) with Ted Shumate
1993: The Breeze and I (Ram) with Joe Diorio
1996: After Hours  (Go Jazz)
2010: A Family Affair  (Origin) with Stu Katz

As sideman
With Art Blakey
 Originally (Columbia, 1956 [1982]) 
With Frank Catalano
 Cut It Out (Delmark, 1997)
With Red Garland
Red Alert (Galaxy, 1977)
With Lin Halliday
 Delayed Exposure (Delmark, 1991)
 East of the Sun (Delmark, 1992)
With Eddie Harris
 Come on Down (Atlantic, 1970)
With Philly Joe Jones
Philly Mignon (Galaxy, 1977)
With Roland Kirk
 Introducing Roland Kirk (Argo, 1960)
With Roberto Magris
 Sun Stone - Roberto Magris Sextet feat. Ira Sullivan (JMood, 2019)
With J. R. Monterose
 J. R. Monterose (Blue Note, 1956)
With Rita Reys
 The Cool Voice of Rita Reys (Columbia, 1956)
With Red Rodney
Live at the Village Vanguard (Muse, 1980)
Hi Jinx at the Vanguard (Muse, 1980 [1984])
Alive in New York (Muse, 1980 [1986])
Night and Day (Muse, 1981)
With Billy Taylor
 The Billy Taylor Trio Introduces Ira Sullivan (ABC-Paramount, 1956)
With Brad Goode
 Toy Trumpet (SteepleChase, 2000)

References

External links

 – official site

Ira Sullivan discography at JazzDiscography.com
Ira Sullivan  - Family First (interview)
Ira Sullivan Interview NAMM Oral History Library (2019)

1931 births
2020 deaths
American jazz trumpeters
American male trumpeters
Bebop trumpeters
Hard bop trumpeters
American jazz flugelhornists
Delmark Records artists
Galaxy Records artists
21st-century trumpeters
21st-century American male musicians
American male jazz musicians
Discovery Records artists